Cordulegaster bidentata, also known as sombre goldenring or two-toothed goldenring, is a species of dragonfly in the family Cordulegastridae.

Description
This species is identifiable by its black body and yellow rings.

Distribution and habitat
C. bidentata is primarily found in Central and Southern Europe, spreading as far south as Sicily, where the subspecies C. bidentata sicilica is found. It lives primarily around mountain springs. This species is scattered throughout Central and Western Europe. The population rate is declining, the biggest threat to this species being droughts which are a result of global warming.

Behaviour and development

C. bidentata breeds in mountain springs, and the larvae are benthic, living in the lowest reaches of the water. As a result of this, larval sites are difficult to locate and study. Breeding takes place in May–June, with eggs being laid in the upper reaches of the streams. Larval development takes between three and five years, and can be slowed if cold weather causes the water to freeze. The larvae may sometimes leave the water, hunting for small arthropods on the ground at night.

References

External links

Cordulegastridae
Insects described in 1843
Dragonflies of Europe